Eiken is a village in Hægebostad municipality in Agder county, Norway.

There is some industry and agriculture as well as a good amount of tourism.  The Sørlandets Rehabiliteringssenter Eiken (Southern Norway Rehabilitation Centre) is located in Eiken and run by the Southern and Eastern Norway Regional Health Authority.  The village is also the site of Eiken Church which serves all of northern Hægebostad.  From 1916 until 1963, the village was the administrative centre of the old municipality of Eiken.

Name
The village (originally the parish) is named after the old Eiken farm.  The name of the farm means "oak tree".

References

Villages in Agder
Hægebostad